Ángela Ruiz Robles (March 28, 1895 Villamanín, León - October 27, 1975, Ferrol, A Coruña) was a Spanish teacher, writer, pioneer and inventor of the mechanical precursor to the electronic book, invented 20 years prior to Michael Hart’s Project Gutenberg, commonly referred to as the true inventor of the e-book, and over half a century before present-day e-books. She received two patents related to her “Mechanical Encyclopedia” (Spanish: la Enciclopedia Mecánica). In 1949, Ruiz was awarded Spanish patent 190,698 for mechanisms with buttons that, when activated and pressed, displayed the learning materials. In her second patent, 276,364, awarded in 1962, she modified the design to remove buttons and instead include rotational reels that presented the subjects and learning materials..

As someone deeply caring for her students and passionate about education, Ruiz Robles designed her mechanical encyclopedia to lighten the weight of the books carried by her students, make learning more attractive, and adapt learning materials to the needs of each student. Her device consisted of a series of text and illustrations on reels, all under a sheet of magnifying glass with a light for reading in the dark, and was to incorporate spoken descriptions of each topic. Her device was never put into production but a prototype is in display at the National Museum of Science and Technology in A Coruña.

Biography 
Ángela Ruiz Robles, also known as "Doña Angelita", was born on March 28, 1895 in Villamanín, León. She was born into a well-off family, as the daughter of Feliciano Ruiz, a pharmacist and Elena Robles, a housewife. She studied to become a teacher and started her professional career in the capital of the province as an instructor of stenography, typing and commercial accounting between 1915 and 1916. In 1917, her municipal council unanimously named her teacher and director of La Pola de Gordón school, located in León. There, she married her husband, Andrés Grandal, and had three daughters, Elena, Elvira, and Maria Carmen.

One year later, in 1918 she moved to Santa Uxía de Mandiá, a small village close to Ferrol, Galicia, where she serve as a teacher until 1928. In 1934 she carried out an important work as manager of the National Girls School Orphanage in Ferrol.

In 1948 she started to work as a teacher at the Ibañez Martín School, became director in 1959 and stayed in the position until her retirement.

Ángela Ruiz Robles lived in a time during and after Spain’s Civil War. In early 20th century Spain, only 25% of the female population knew how to read and write, and the female illiteracy rate was 60% higher than in men.7 Women were primarily housewives, with most of them hardly having the most basic education. For that reason, Ruiz Robles’ work and accomplishments are that more significant and worthy of being highlighted.

As a person, Ángela Ruiz Robles was well-known and admired for her devotion to her students and for striving to innovate the outdated teaching methods of the time. Throughout her life, all of her books, inventions, and career were centered around making education accessible, easier, and enjoyable for all types of students and all their specific needs. In her spare time, Doña Angelita taught free night lessons to people with fewer resources.8 She went as far as visiting her students’ homes at the end of the day to ensure they learned and understood class material.

Ruiz Robles passed away in 1975 in Ferrol. Up until her death, Ruiz Robles paid all her patent fees for her mechanical book.

Works and legacy 
Between 1938 and 1946 Ruiz Robles published 16 books to help children study.

In 1944, Ángela Ruiz Robles carried out the project of the Grammatical Scientific Atlas to help expand the knowledge on grammar, syntax, morphology, orthography and phonetics across the country. She later designed and improved a tachymecanographic machine.

In 1948 she patented the first proposal for the Mechanical Encyclopaedia (Spanish patent number 190,698). In her patent, she stated the objectives of her invention were to lighten the weight of student's school bags, improve the learning process, and make learning more intuitive and enjoyable. 

In 1962, Ángela Ruiz Robles applied for a second patent, 276,346, for her Mechanical Encyclopedia idea through a more simplified device. A prototype following this design was built in 1962. Her prototype was made of bronze, wood, and zinc. However, the invention never reached the public since it was not possible for her to find the appropriate funding.  

She was the founder, director, and professor at the academy for adults Elmaca, which she named after the initials of her three daughters. 

In 1970, Ruiz Robles rejected a proposal to license her patents in the United States. She wanted her invention to be developed in Spain because "Ferrol was its starting ground". Since 2006, her Mechanical Encyclopedia was part of the Pedagogical Museum of Galicia, in Santiago de Compostela. In 2012, it was moved to the National Museum of Science and Technology in A Coruña Spain, and has been there ever since.

Mechanical Encyclopedia 
The following is a translated description of the device:

Awards and honours

Throughout her life, Ángela Ruiz Robles received a number of awards and recognitions both nationally and internationally for her inventions, despite them never going into production.
 The Civil Order of Alfonso X the Wise to recognize her social work and innovation in training along professional career (1947).
 The Gold Medal at an Exhibition for Spanish inventors (1952).
 The Oscar for invention at the Official and National Fair of Zaragoza (1957).
 The Bronze Medal at the International Exhibition in Brussels (1957).
 The Bronze Medal for educational innovation in Brussels (1958).
 The Silver Medal at the International Exhibition of Inventions in Brussels (1963).
 Medal at the Seville Exhibition (1964). 
Geneva Medal for Spanish inventors (1968).

She appears in the 2011 Spanish publication 200 Years of Patents in the "Women" section, published by the Spanish Ministry of Industry.

Ruiz Robles’s 121st birthday was the subject of a Google Doodle on March 28, 2016.

In 2018, a street was named after her in the Spanish capital to recognize and celebrate her contributions.

References

1895 births
1975 deaths
20th-century Spanish inventors
Women inventors
People from the Province of León
20th-century Spanish educators
Spanish women educators
Recipients of the Civil Order of Alfonso X, the Wise